Know Your History: Jesus Is Black; So Was Cleopatra, is a 2007 stand-up comedy film starring comedian Paul Mooney and directed by Bart Phillips.

The show was filmed at the Laugh Factory before a live audience.

References

External links

Stand-up comedy concert films
2007 films
African-American films
American documentary films
2000s English-language films
2000s American films